Ischnocnema gualteri is a species of frog in the family Brachycephalidae. It is endemic to the state of Rio de Janeiro, Brazil, and is only known from the Serra dos Órgãos ("Organ Mountains"). Common name Organ Mountains robber frog has been coined for this species.

Etymology
The specific name gualteri honors Gualter Adolpho Lutz, brother of Bertha Lutz who described the species. Lutz thanks him for collecting many of the specimens as well as color photographs.

Description
Adult males measure  and females  in snout–vent length. It is a robustly built frog with massive head, as wide as long. The tympanum is partly visible. The hind limbs are long. The digits are narrow and fringed, with the outer ones ending with a large disc. Toes have rudiments of webbing. Skin is mostly smooth but there are a few warts, particularly on the head and the upper eyelids. Dorsal coloration is brown with variable patterning. The iris is strikingly copper colored.

Habitat and conservation
It lives on the forest floor.

There are no threats to this species at present. It occurs in the Serra dos Órgãos National Park.

References

gualteri
Endemic fauna of Brazil
Amphibians of Brazil
Taxa named by Bertha Lutz
Amphibians described in 1974
Taxonomy articles created by Polbot